The Alternating Gradient Synchrotron (AGS) is a particle accelerator located at the Brookhaven National Laboratory in Long Island, New York, United States.

The Alternating Gradient Synchrotron was built on the innovative concept of the alternating gradient, or strong-focusing principle, developed by Brookhaven physicists.  This new concept in accelerator design allowed scientists to accelerate protons to energies that were previously unachievable.  The AGS became the world's premiere accelerator when it reached its design energy of 33 billion electron volts (GeV) on July 29, 1960.

Until 1968, the AGS was the highest energy accelerator in the world, slightly higher than its 28 GeV sister machine, the Proton Synchrotron at CERN, the European laboratory for high-energy physics. While 21st century accelerators can reach energies in the trillion electron volt region, the AGS earned researchers three Nobel Prizes and today serves as the injector for Brookhaven's Relativistic Heavy Ion Collider; it remains the world's highest intensity high-energy proton accelerator.

The AGS Booster, constructed in 1991, further augments the capabilities of the AGS, enabling it to accelerate more intense proton beams and heavy ions such as Gold.  Brookhaven's linear particle accelerator (LINAC) provides 200 million electron volt (MeV) protons to the AGS Booster, and the Electron Beam Ion Source (EBIS) and  Tandem Van de Graaff accelerators provide other ions to the AGS Booster.  The AGS Booster then accelerates these particles for injection into the AGS.  The AGS Booster also provides particle beams to the NASA Space Radiation Laboratory.

Importance of alternate-gradient focusing

Nobel Prizes
The work performed at the accelerator led to three Nobel Prizes in Physics: 
1962: Leon Lederman, Melvin Schwartz and Jack Steinberger discovered the muon neutrino.
1976: Samuel C. C. Ting discovered the J part of the J/ψ and the charm quark.
1980: James Cronin and Val Fitch discovered CP violation by experimenting with Kaons.

See also
Strong focusing (also known as alternating-gradient focusing — an idea pioneered on this accelerator)

References

External links

Brookhaven National Laboratory: Alternating Gradient Synchrotron web page

Particle physics facilities
Brookhaven National Laboratory